Yvonne Madelaine Brill (née Claeys; December 30, 1924 – March 27, 2013) was a Canadian American rocket and jet propulsion engineer. She is responsible for inventing the Electrothermal Hydrazine Thruster (EHT/Resistojet), a fuel-efficient rocket thruster that keeps today’s satellites in orbit, and holds a patent for its invention. During her career she was involved in a broad range of national space programs in the United States, including NASA and the International Maritime Satellite Organization.

Early life
Born in Winnipeg, Manitoba, Canada, Yvonne Brill, is a first-generation Canadian, as her parents were immigrants from Belgium. She was inspired to attend school by Amelia Earhart, the first woman pilot to fly across the Atlantic Ocean. When she was young, her father encouraged her to open a shop in their hometown, while her high school science teacher told her that a woman wouldn't get anywhere in science. She ignored both. Yvonne was the first in her family to go to college, graduating from the University of Manitoba in 1945 at the top of her class with a bachelor’s degree in both chemistry and mathematics (Int. Engineering). She had originally applied to their engineering program at 18, but was denied by the school, as they claimed that their mandatory summer camp did not have the necessary facilities to host female students. Her denial to Manitoba’s school of engineering forever inspired her to encourage women in the sciences, and in her, forged an unwavering confidence against gender-based discrimination. She went on to study at the University of Southern California, where she took night classes and graduated in 1951 with a master's degree in chemistry.

Personal life 
After completing her master's degree at the University of Southern California, Yvonne met William Brill, a research chemist, at RAND. The two were married within a year, and they soon moved East for William’s job at FMC Corporation.

The couple would move wherever work took him, and Yvonne later began working part-time jobs so that she could care for their two sons, Matthew and Joseph, and a daughter, Naomi.

Career
Following her graduation from USC, Brill began working at Douglas Aircraft in 1945 after being recruited despite her lack of an engineering degree. Her main interest was in engineering, but she transferred to Douglas’ chemistry department to work with rocket propellants, rocket engines, and ramjets. She then began working on the Project RAND contract at Douglas where they focused on a new field of rockets, including the first American satellite. It is believed that Brill was the only female rocket scientist in the 1940s, which was partly what attracted her to this line of work.

After raising her children and returning to full-time work, she took a position at RCA’s rocket subsidiary, Astro Electronics. Here, she developed the concept for a new rocket engine, inventing the Electrothermal Hydrazine Thruster (EHT/Resistojet) for which she holds US Patent No. 3,807,657. Her innovation resulted in not only higher engine performance, but also increased the reliability of the propulsion system. She also proposed the use of a single propellant because of the value and simplicity that it would provide. The reduction in propellant weight requirements enabled either increased payload capability or extended mission life. The Resistojet proved to be more suitable for controlling satellites’ orbit and their communication. 

Her invention became a standard in the industry and has translated into millions of dollars of increased revenue for commercial communications satellite owners. Large aeronautics and aviation companies including, but not limited to, RCA, GE, Lockheed Martin, and Orbital Sciences have used the EHT in their communication satellites.

Brill contributed to the propulsion systems of TIROS, the first weather satellite; Nova, a series of rocket designs that were used in American Moon missions; Explorer 32, the first upper-atmosphere satellite; and the Mars Observer, which in 1992 almost entered a Mars orbit before losing communication with Earth.

Between the years of 1981 and 1983, Brill also contributed to development of the rocket engines of NASA’s space shuttles. She finished her career at NASA, overseeing the Space Shuttle Solid Rocket Program and on the Aerospace Safety Advisory Panel.

Awards and honors
In light of her brilliance in the field of rocket science and subsequent contributions, Brill was the recipient of many prestigious awards and founded scholarships and a lectureship. 

 The NASA Distinguished Public Service Medal (2001).  This is the highest honor that NASA awards to non-government employees who demonstrate a level of excellence that has made a profound impact to NASA mission success.

 The AIAA Wyld Propulsion Award (2002) This award is given annually to honor outstanding achievements in the development or application or rocket propulsion systems. She was presented the award considering her innovations in electric on-orbit propulsion systems.
 The American Association of Engineering Societies John Fritz Medal (2009). This medal is described as Nobel prize of engineering, or the highest award within the profession.
 The Harper's Bazaar and the DeBeers Corporation Diamond Superwoman Award (1980). Given to her for returning to a successful career after starting a family. 
 In 2010, President Barack Obama bestowed her with the National Medal of Technology and Innovation.[2] is given to American’s leading innovators who have made outstanding  contributions to the development of new and important technology that support America’s economic, environmental, and social well-being.
 The National Inventors Hall of Fame (2010)

Brill was elected to the National Academy of Engineering (1987). She was also named fellow of The Society of Women Engineers (SWE) in 1985 and received its highest honor, the Achievement Award, the following year.

The Yvonne C. Brill Lectureship of the American Institute of Aeronautics and Astronautics (AIAA) is named in her honor and presented annually. She spent the last twenty years of her life promoting women in science and engineering and nominated them for awards and prizes she thought they deserved.

Death and legacy
At age 88, Yvonne Brill died of complications of breast cancer in Princeton, New Jersey.

An obituary of Brill published in the March 30, 2013, issue of the New York Times drew much news coverage not necessarily because of her remarkable accomplishments in the field of rocket science, but due to apparent sexism. It originally began: "She made a mean beef stroganoff, followed her husband from job to job and took eight years off from work to raise three children". Only several paragraphs later would you be able to find out that she was actually working part-time while raising her children, and then returning to full-time employment that lead to her fame for her research and innovations. The obituary was heavily criticized for leading with and overemphasizing Brill's gender and family life, rather than her remarkable scientific and career achievements and was cited as an example of an article that failed the Finkbeiner test. The Times later dropped the reference to her cooking and changed the lead of the article.

Brill’s legacy has forever impacted the present and future of rocket science, as her research and contributions to rocket propulsion systems, as well as her invention of the electrothermal hydrazine thruster have and will continue to help us to learn and understand more about the final frontier.

See also
 Timeline of women in science

References

External links
 Video of Brill talking about her work, from the National Science & Technology Medals Foundation

1924 births
2013 deaths
Deaths from cancer in New Jersey
Deaths from breast cancer
People from Montgomery Township, New Jersey
University of Manitoba alumni
University of Southern California alumni
Members of the United States National Academy of Engineering
Rocket scientists
Women inventors
American women engineers
20th-century Canadian women scientists
American women scientists
National Medal of Technology recipients
20th-century women engineers
Canadian emigrants to the United States
21st-century American women